Garudinia pseudosimulana is a moth of the family Erebidae. It was described by Jagbir Singh Kirti and Navneet Singh Gill in 2008. It is found in Karnataka, India.

References

 

Cisthenina
Moths described in 2008